Catapyrenium is a genus of lichens in the family Verrucariaceae. The genus was circumscribed by German botanist Julius von Flotow in 1850.

Species
Catapyrenium adami-borosi 
Catapyrenium boccanum 
Catapyrenium chilense  
Catapyrenium cinereum 
Catapyrenium dactylinum 
Catapyrenium daedaleum 
Catapyrenium fuscatum 
Catapyrenium lachneum 
Catapyrenium lambii 
Catapyrenium michelii 
Catapyrenium oxneri 
Catapyrenium pamiricum 
Catapyrenium pilosellum 
Catapyrenium psoromoides 
Catapyrenium rufescens 
Catapyrenium simulans 
Catapyrenium squamellum 
Catapyrenium squamulosum

References

Verrucariales
Eurotiomycetes genera
Lichen genera
Taxa named by Julius von Flotow
Taxa described in 1850